Josimar Rodrigues Souza Roberto, or simply Josimar (born August 16, 1987), is a Brazilian striker .

Club statistics

References

External links
 

1987 births
Living people
Brazilian footballers
Brazilian expatriate footballers
Expatriate footballers in Japan
J1 League players
J2 League players
Ipatinga Futebol Clube players
Ventforet Kofu players
Ehime FC players
Tokyo Verdy players
Clube Náutico Capibaribe players
Clube Esportivo Lajeadense players
Al-Fateh SC players
Army United F.C. players
Port F.C. players
PTT Rayong F.C. players
Thai League 1 players
Thai League 2 players
Expatriate footballers in Saudi Arabia
Expatriate footballers in Thailand
Brazilian expatriate sportspeople in Japan
Brazilian expatriate sportspeople in Saudi Arabia
Brazilian expatriate sportspeople in Thailand
Saudi Professional League players
Association football forwards